Antirhea jamaicensis is a species of plant in the family Rubiaceae. It is endemic to Jamaica.

Sources
 

jam
Endemic flora of Jamaica
Near threatened plants
Taxonomy articles created by Polbot
Taxobox binomials not recognized by IUCN